Coleophora aenusella is a moth of the family Coleophoridae. It is found in the United States, including Kentucky.

References

aenusella
Moths described in 1878
Moths of North America